Albert Jordy "Al" Raboteau II (September 4, 1943 – September 18, 2021) was an American scholar of African and African-American religions. Since 1982, he had been affiliated with Princeton University, where he was Henry W. Putnam Professor of Religion.

Biography

Early life and education
Albert Raboteau was born into a Catholic family in Bay St. Louis, Mississippi, three months after his father, Albert Jordy Raboteau, Sr. (1899–1943), was killed there by a white man. The killer claimed self-defense and was never prosecuted. Raboteau was named for his late father, who was of African and French Creole descent.

His widowed mother moved the family from Mississippi, where she was a teacher, to find a better place in the North for her children to grow up. She married again, to Royal Woods, an African-American minister. They lived in Ann Arbor, Michigan, for a period and in California. Raboteau's stepfather taught the boy Latin and Greek starting at the age of five years, and helped him to focus on church and education as he grew up. Raboteau attended Catholic parochial schools.  When he was 11 years old he traveled with other choir boys from St. Thomas Catholic Church of Ann Arbor to sing in an international choir festival at the Vatican.

Raboteau was accepted into college at the age of 16. He earned his Bachelor of Arts degree at Loyola University in Los Angeles, California in 1964 and a Master of Arts degree in English from the University of California, Berkeley. Around this time, Raboteau married and started a family.

Raboteau entered the Yale Graduate Program in Religious Studies, where he studied with American religious historian Sydney Ahlstrom and African-American historian John Blassingame, receiving his Doctor of Philosophy degree in 1974.

Raboteau's dissertation, later revised and published as the book Slave Religion: The "Invisible Institution" in the Antebellum South, was published just as the black studies movement was gaining steam in the 1970s. It was a time of revolutionary scholarship on American slavery: Blassingame's Slave Community (1972) and Slave Testimony (1977); Eugene Genovese's Roll, Jordan, Roll (1974), Olli Alho's The Religion of Slaves (1976), and Lawrence Levine's Black Culture and Black Consciousness (1977).

Career
In 1982 Princeton University hired Raboteau, first as a visiting professor and then as full-time faculty. He was the Henry W. Putnam Professor of Religion. His research and teaching focus on American Catholic history, African-American religions, and religion and immigration issues.  He chaired the Department of Religion (1987–92) and also served as dean of the Graduate School (1992–93).

He received the university's MLK Day Lifetime Service Award (Journey Award) in both 2005 and 2006.

In 2013 Raboteau retired but continued to teach as a professor emeritus. He then studied "the place of beauty in the history of Eastern and Western Christian Spirituality."

Later life 
In January 2021, Raboteau entered hospice care. He died on September 18, 2021 in Princeton, New Jersey, aged 78, due to Lewy body dementia.

Personal life
In the late 20th century, Raboteau converted to Eastern Orthodoxy at a time of personal crisis and divorce from his first wife. At the time of his conversion, he took the name Panteleimon, a term for God meaning the "all merciful". As of 2002, he served as lay coordinator of Mother of God Joy of All Who Sorrow Orthodox Mission in Rocky Hill, New Jersey.

He was married three times and had four children: Albert III, Charles, Martin, and Emily.

Honors
 He was the first recipient of the J.W.C. Pennington Award from the University of Heidelberg.
 In 2013 The Journal of Africana Religions established the annual Albert J. Raboteau Book Prize, awarded by a five-member committee to a book that" exemplifies the ethos and mission" of the journal. It is an international prize awarded to books by academic publishers.
 In 2015 he gave the Stone Lectures at Princeton Theological Seminary.

Books
 Slave Religion: The Invisible Institution in the Antebellum South, New York: Oxford University Press, 1978/updated edition published in 2002. . 
 A Fire in the Bones: Reflections on African-American Religious History, Boston: Beacon Press, 1995. .
 African American Religion: Interpretive Essays in History and Culture, New York: Routledge, 1997. . Co-edited with Timothy E. Fulop.
 Canaan Land: A Religious History of African Americans. New York: Oxford University Press, 1999. .
 A Sorrowful Joy: A Spiritual Journey of an African-American Man in Late Twentieth-Century America, New York: Paulist Press, 2002. .
 Immigration and Religion in America: Comparative and Historical Perspectives, co-edited with Richard Alba and Josh DeWind; New York: New York University Press, 2008 
 American Prophets: Seven Religious Radicals and Their Struggle for Social and Political Justice, Princeton University Press: 2016

See also
 George Alexander McGuire
 Raphael Morgan

References

External links
 Princeton University faculty page
 Princeton University Martin Luther King Day Celebration 2006, where Raboteau received the Journey Award for Lifetime Service

1943 births
2021 deaths
20th-century African-American writers
20th-century American historians
20th-century American male writers
20th-century Eastern Orthodox Christians
21st-century African-American writers
21st-century American historians
21st-century American male writers
21st-century Eastern Orthodox Christians
African-American historians
American historians of religion
American Roman Catholic religious writers
Converts to Eastern Orthodoxy from Roman Catholicism
Eastern Orthodox Christians from the United States
Historians from Mississippi
Historians from New Jersey
Historians of Christianity
Loyola Marymount University alumni
Marquette University alumni
People from Bay St. Louis, Mississippi
Princeton University faculty
Scholars in Eastern Orthodoxy
University of California, Berkeley alumni
Yale University alumni
20th-century Roman Catholics
21st-century Roman Catholics
American male non-fiction writers
African-American male writers